Saurabh Chaudhary (born 12 May 2002) is an Indian sport shooter. He won the gold medal at the 2018 Asian Games in 10 m Air Pistol. He was the youngest Indian gold medalist at the Asian Games. He had earlier won gold medals and set a new junior world record in the ISSF Junior World Cup in Suhl, Germany. He is the only Indian shooter to win a gold medal in ISSF World Championship, ISSF World Cup, Youth Olympic Games, Asian Games and Asian Air Gun Championship. He broke his own world record with a score of 245.5 and claimed gold in Junior Men 10m Air Pistol at 2018 World Championship in Changwon, Korea.

Early life 
He was born in Kalina village in district Meerut of western Uttar Pradesh (India). He comes from a family of farmers living in Yamuna and Gangatic plains of western UP. His father is Jagmohan Singh Siwach. He took up shooting at 13 and practised daily, traveling 15 km each way on buses to his club run by Aryangateways Sports Foundation. His coach Amit Sheoran identified his talent and groomed him from grassroot level.

Olympic Journey 
From Tin-Shed Academy to  Tokyo Olympics. Just months before event Saurabh Chaudhary was effected by COVID-19. But, sensational shooter Chaudhary fired his way into the finals of the men's 10m air pistol event by topping the qualifications at 1st position with 586/600 with a mind-blowing performance in the Tokyo Olympics here on Saturday. Coach Amit Sheoran hard work at Aryangateways Sports Foundation for Saurabh proved itself in Olympics. Unfortunately in finals medal slipped off even after the entry at first position.

At the age of 16 years, he won Gold n 10m air pistol at the Youth Olympic Games in Buenos Aires. And shot 244.2 to finish on top ahead of South Korea's Sung Yunho (236.7) and Switzerland's Solari Jason (215.6), who bagged silver and bronze respectively.

2018 
Chaudhary became the youngest Indian shooter to win a gold medal at the Asian Games. He participated in the Youth Olympic Games 2018 in Argentina and won gold. He won three golds in the Asian Airgun Championship in 2018:the 10m air pistol competition, the team competition and in the mixed team 10m pistol.

2019 
In February he won the gold medal at ISSF World Cup in Delhi.

In April, he participated in Mixed Team 10m pistol with Manu Bhaker and won gold at ISSF World Cup in Beijing.

In May he won gold and broke the world and junior records in 10m pistol ISSF World Cup in Munich.

2020 
In January 2020,he won 63rd gold at the 63rd National Shooting Championship.in men's 10 metre air pistol.

International career

Youth Olympic Games

World Championship

Asian Games

World Cup

10 Meter Air Pistol

Mixed Team

See also 

National Rifle Association of India (NRAI)
International Shooting Sports Federation (ISSF)
Sports Authoruity of India (SAI)
Uttar Pradesh State Rifle Association (UPSRA)

References

External links 

Aryangateways Sports Foundation (AGSF)

Living people
2002 births
Indian male sport shooters
Shooters at the 2018 Asian Games
Medalists at the 2018 Asian Games
Asian Games gold medalists for India
Asian Games medalists in shooting
Shooters at the 2018 Summer Youth Olympics
Youth Olympic gold medalists for India
Recipients of the Arjuna Award
Olympic shooters of India
Shooters at the 2020 Summer Olympics
21st-century Indian people